Malir Expressway is a 39 km under construction expressway starting from KPT Interchange, passes through Qayyumabad and conclude at the Karachi-Hyderabad Motorway near Kathore, along the Malir River in Karachi, Pakistan. One of the major infrastructure developments in Karachi city which is unviable for the provincial government and detrimental to the city's climate. It was announced that half of it will be opened on 14th August 2023; as of right now there is illegal excavation happening on the Malir River bed and the fields of Malir; it is unlikely that Expressway will be completed given the litigation and damage to the only surviving river in Karachi.

Route Map and Construction
It was approved by Sindh Provincial Government in 2020.Malir Expressway route map was modified in 2021 in a way that ensures minimum people get displaced but at the cost of destroying the only river in the city- the historical Malir River. Construction of began in January 2022 before the Environmental Impact Assessment (EIA) report was shared with public. In the EIA hearing held in March 2022. Over 100 objections were raised and presented to the Sindh Environmental Protection Agency (SEPA); none of the objections were addressed and the construction continued unabated. The EIA of Malir Expressway is being contested in the district courts due to following major reasons:

The construction is being done on the river bed and the flood plains of Malir River passing through Shah Faisal Town. It will be flooded every year during Monsoon Season.
It will be destroying green fields and agricultural land of various rural areas (referred to as Goths). Thousands of fully grown trees will be cut. The ecological damage as a result will be devastating. This is happening when the Federal Minister of Climate Change & Environment is Senator Sherry Rehman
Many people will get displaced and forced to relocate to other areas because their houses were demolished to make way for the Expressway. 
Many people will get unemployed because Green fields were the only source of their livelihood. 
Many local bird, mammal and fish species will become endangered due to change in their natural habitat.
The construction of the 39KM expressway will add to concretization of the city. Additional traffic would cause additional greenhouse gas emissions and noise pollution hence increasing global warming and yearly heatwaves

70% of Malir Expressway Route was cleared and levelled by March 2023. Half the Expressway is slated to open for traffic by 14th August 2023. Other half would open by mid-2024. While construction is ongoing, much would depend on the ongoing court case on the Environmental Initial Assessment Report of the project and any consequent construction delays.

Typical cross-section 
It will be a four-lane carriageway,  however it has also been declared to be a six-lane carriageway in the documentation of the Asian Development Bank. It will have a three-lane service road on both sides.

Structures 
The project includes three flyovers and eight underpasses,  which increases the chances of high-speed accidents that expressways are prone to.

DBFOT 
Design, Built, Finance, Operate & Maintain and Transfer (DBFOT) arrangement with a concession period of 28 years

Southern alternative route 
The expressway would serve as the Southern alternative route for carrying traffic of the port and industrial areas to main highways. It will not reduce traffic on the existing Shahrah-e-Faisal since the expected traffic flow will be mostly of high-income car passengers, whereas the traffic on Sharae Faisal will be redistributed on all the other public transport projects happening in the city

Interchanges 

 Qayyumabad
 EBM Causeway
 Korangi – Shah Faisal Colony Bridge
 Shahrah-e-Faisal (N-5) near Quaidabad 
 Between 25–30 km
 Kathore on Karachi-Hyderabad Motorway (M-9)

See also 
 Malir River
 Malir Town
 Malir District
 Malir Cantonment
 M-9 motorway (Pakistan)
 M-10 motorway (Pakistan)
 List of expressways of Pakistan
Transport in Karachi
Port Qasim

References 

Proposed roads in Pakistan